Mike Mitchell (born c. 1995) is a jazz drummer who plays in the Stanley Clarke band. He is regarded as a jazz prodigy.

He is part of Greg Spero's Spirit Fingers

See also
List of jazz drummers

References

1990s births
Living people
Year of birth uncertain
Place of birth missing (living people)
American jazz drummers